Sieglsee is the name of two adjacent lakes in Tyrol, Austria, the Große Sieglsee and the Kleine Sieglsee.

They are nearly circular sinkhole lakes. The lakes came into existence as collapse sinks in the Raibl Formation with sandstones, slate and rauhwacke (crystallized dolomite). The lakes drain via the river Sieglseebach into the Schwarzwasserbach. The deep and clear lakes are used for diving.

Lakes of Tyrol (state)